Peach Grove is an unincorporated community in Pendleton County, Kentucky, United States. Immaculate Conception Catholic Church and Cemetery, which is listed on the National Register of Historic Places, is located near Peach Grove.

Notable residents
Orie Solomon Ware, U.S. Representative from Kentucky

References

Unincorporated communities in Pendleton County, Kentucky
Unincorporated communities in Kentucky